Tarvastu Castle is a 14th-century castle in Sooviku in Tarvastu Parish, Viljandi County, Estonia.

See also
List of castles in Estonia

References

Castles in Estonia
Ruined castles in Estonia
Viljandi Parish
Buildings and structures in Viljandi County
Tourist attractions in Viljandi County
Castles of the Teutonic Knights